POTY may refer to:

 Person of the Year
 Player of the year award

People
 Édouard Poty, Belgian sports shooter
 Poty Lazzarotto (1924–1998), Brazilian artist